Sassafras Mountain is the highest point in the state of South Carolina, United States. It is in the Blue Ridge Mountains, part of the Appalachian Mountains. An observation tower opened on top of Sassafras Mountain in 2019.

Location
It is located along the South Carolina - North Carolina border in northern Pickens County, South Carolina nearest to the town of Rosman, North Carolina. From I-85 Exit 21 in South Carolina, one can reach Sassafras Mountain by driving north on US-178 until reaching the unincorporated community of Rocky Bottom. From Rosman, follow US-178 south. The summit is an easy 300 foot walk from the parking lot and is, by merit of not having stairs, wheelchair accessible, although the path is fairly steep.

The North Carolina side of the mountain was owned by former Congressman Charles H. Taylor. In June 2010 he sold  to The Conservation Fund. The Fund has donated , at the top of the mountain, to the South Carolina Department of Natural Resources and conveyed a remaining  to the North Carolina Forest Service for Headwaters State Forest.

The Pisgah Quadrangle topographical map, revised 1904–1905, shows the long abandoned Sassafras Gap Road to be the preferred route through to Rosman, N.C. and Brevard, N.C. at the end of the 19th century and that the existing Highway 178 was then a secondary road. This abandoned road is a short distance from the summit and is crossed by the hiking trail to Caesars Head from Sassafras summit. Most people crossing this old roadbed in Sassafras Gap don't recognize it as a road, but it is easily recognized because of the short section of steps going down into the roadbed, and a similar section of short steps on the opposite side of the roadbed going up and the trail then continuing steeply up toward Caesars Head. A short hike South down the old Sassafras Gap Road will take you to Hickory Head Spring, the headwater of the South Saluda River. Hickory Head Spring is shown as a feature on the Mill's Atlas, 1825, Greenville District, South Carolina.

Geology
The granite that originally formed Sassafras Mountain has metamorphosed into Henderson Gneiss, which is quartz, muscovite, and feldspar.

See also

 Outline of South Carolina
 Index of South Carolina-related articles
 List of U.S. states by elevation

References

External links
 

Mountains of North Carolina
Mountains of South Carolina
Protected areas of Pickens County, South Carolina
Mountains of Transylvania County, North Carolina
Landforms of Pickens County, South Carolina
Highest points of U.S. states
North American 1000 m summits